Jeon Mi-ra and Cho Yoon-jeong were the defending champions from 2004, but both decided not to compete in 2005.

Chan Yung-jan and Chuang Chia-jung won the title.

Seeds

  Gisela Dulko /  María Vento-Kabchi (first round)
  Lisa McShea /  Bryanne Stewart (first round)
  Laura Granville /  Abigail Spears (semifinals)
  Marion Bartoli /  Tamarine Tanasugarn (first round)

Draw

Results

References

2005 Doubles
Korea Open Doubles
Korea Open Doubles